Phrynopus auriculatus is a species of frog in the family Strabomantidae. It is endemic to Peru and only known from its type locality near Oxapampa, Pasco, at  asl. It inhabits humid montane forest.

References

auriculatus
Amphibians of the Andes
Amphibians of Peru
Endemic fauna of Peru
Frogs of South America
Amphibians described in 2008